Tutnese (also known as Tut and Tutahash) is an argot created by enslaved African Americans based on African-American Vernacular English as a method to covertly teach and learn spelling and reading.

Language rules
In Tutnese, vowels are pronounced normally, but each consonant is replaced with a different syllable. The linguistics journal American Speech published the following table detailing syllables that replace consonants in Tutnese:

A different set of syllables for the Tutahash language game had appeared in The New York Times Magazine several decades earlier, and the author noted the similarities between Tutahash and the "Double Dutch" language game, which he claimed to be the third most widely spoken language game in the United States when he was writing in 1944, but he also indicated several differences between the two, detailed in the following table:

Double letters in a word, rather than being repeated, are preceded by the syllable square or squa to indicate doubling. For doubled vowels, the prefix becomes squat instead—thus, OO would be spoken as squat-oh.

For example, "tree" becomes "Tutrugsquatee" and "I took a walk to the park yesterday" becomes "I tutsquatohkuck a wackalulkuck tuto tuthashe pubarugkuck yubesustuterugdudayub."

While spaces between words are always ignored, at least one "dialect" of the language requires that the first syllable of the name of any given punctuation mark be spoken, thus a full stop (period) is Per, a question mark is Que (Kway or Kay, varies), and a comma is Com.

History
Enslaved African Americans were not permitted to read or write, and could be severely punished if they were discovered to be literate. African Americans in the southeastern United States created Tutnese to covertly teach spelling and reading. Some used it in the presence of authority figures, such as slave masters or police.

After the abolishment of slavery it became legal for freed African-Americans to learn to read and write, thus Tutnese fell out of practice for many. Since one of the main reasons Tutnese was created was for enslaved African Americans to learn to read and write, over time the language naturally was spoken by fewer people.

In the mid-1990s, Gloria McIlwain published an academic article and a book on the Tut language. In 2021, Tutnese gained traction on social media platforms, including Discord, Google Classroom and TikTok. For some social media users, learning Tutnese was a way perpetuate African American traditions and culture. The social media discourse around Tutnese also saw debate over gatekeeping the language game, with some advocating for its being shared only in closed groups among African Americans whose ancestors were enslaved in the United States while others promoted public sharing of the game and its rules to reach as many African Americans as possible.

There is a version used in some parts of the United States called Yuckish or Yukkish, which uses more or less the same constructs.

Literary mentions
In Ernest Thompson Seton's book Two Little Savages, the protagonist, Yan, learns the "Tutnee" language game from another boy at camp and tries to teach it to his friends Sam and Giles. Seton presents Tutnee alongside many Native American stereotypes but does not mention its African American origin.

Maya Angelou mentions learning Tutnese as a child in I Know Why the Caged Bird Sings, the first volume of her series of autobiographies. She and her friend Louise "spent tedious hours teaching ourselves the Tut language. You (yak oh you) know (kack nug oh wug) what (wack hash a tut). Since all the other children spoke Pig Latin, we were superior because Tut was hard to speak and even harder to understand. At last I began to understand what girls giggled about. Louise would rattle off a few sentences to me in the unintelligible Tut language and would laugh. Naturally I laughed too. Snickered, really, understanding nothing. I don't think she understood half of what she was saying herself, but, after all, girls have to giggle..."

See also
 Gibberish (language game)
 Leet
 Pig Latin
 Rövarspråket
 Verlan

References

Language games
English-based argots